The canton of Saint-Alban-sur-Limagnole is an administrative division of the Lozère department, southern France. Its borders were modified at the French canton reorganisation which came into effect in March 2015. Its seat is in Saint-Alban-sur-Limagnole.

It consists of the following communes:

 Chastel-Nouvel
 Chaulhac
 Fontans
 Julianges
 Lajo
 Les Laubies
 Le Malzieu-Forain
 Le Malzieu-Ville
 Monts-de-Randon
 Paulhac-en-Margeride
 Saint-Alban-sur-Limagnole
 Saint-Denis-en-Margeride
 Sainte-Eulalie
 Saint-Gal
 Saint-Léger-du-Malzieu
 Saint-Privat-du-Fau
 Serverette

References

Cantons of Lozère